The Order of Boyacá is the highest peacetime decoration of Colombia. The order is awarded for exceptional service to distinguished Colombian military officers and civilians as well as foreign citizens of friendly nations. Established in 1922, the Order of Boyacá traces its origin to a Cruz de Boyacá that was awarded to the generals who led their forces to victory in the Battle of Boyaca in 1819. Reestablished in 1919 as an award for military personnel the order has undergone revisions and expansions into its current form, with the biggest change happening in 1922 where civilians became eligible to be awarded the Order of Boyaca.

Grades
The Order of Boyacá is awarded in eight different grades:
 Grand Collar (Gran Collar), awarded to heads of state and to the President of Colombia upon his election.
 Grand Cross Extraordinary (Gran Cruz Extraordinaria), awarded to former heads of state and Colombian Cardinals.
 Grand Cross (Gran Cruz), awarded to Cardinals, Ambassadors, Ministers of State, Marshals, Generals of the Armed Forces, Lieutenant Generals, Admirals, or individuals of an equal or similar rank.
 Grand Officer (Gran Oficial), awarded to Envoys Extraordinary and Ministers Plenipotentiary, Archbishops, Major Generals, Brigadier Generals, Admirals, Vice Admirals, or individuals of an equal or similar rank.
 Silver Cross (Cruz de Plata), awarded to individuals and organizations as recognition for tenure and length of service.
 Commander (Comendador), awarded to Ministers Residents, business owners and managers, Bishops, Colonels, Lieutenant colonels, Majors, Captains, Commanders, Lieutenant Commanders, or individuals of an equal or similar rank.
 Officer (Oficial), Chargé d'affaires ad interim, Counselors, First Secretaries, Consul Generals, Captains, Lieutenants, or individuals of an equal or similar rank.
 Knight (Caballero), awarded to Second and Third Secretaries, Consuls and Vice-Consuls, Attachés to embassies and legations, Lieutenants and Second Lieutenants, Lieutenants (junior grade) and Ensigns, or individuals of an equal or similar rank.

Notable recipients
1925 – : King Alfonso XIII 
1925 – : Queen Victoria Eugenie
1925 – : Juan Vicente Gómez, President of Venezuela
1937 – : Tomáš Masaryk, 1st President of Czechoslovakia
1937 – : Edvard Beneš,  2nd President of Czechoslovakia
1963 – : Chiang Kai-shek, 1st President of the Republic of China
1980 – : Urho Kekkonen, President of Finland
1992 – : Mieczyslaw Biernacki
1992 – : Youssef Fassi Fihri
1993 – : Queen Elizabeth II<ref name="List of Orders of Her Majesty Queen Elizabeth II" 
2010 - : Sebastián Piñera, 34th and 36th President of Chile
2015 - : Felipe VI, King of Spain
2016 - : Joe Biden, 46th President of the United States
2021 - : Moon Jae-in, President of South Korea
2022 - :  Luis Abinader, 54th President of the Dominican Republic
2023 - : Gabriel Boric, 35th President of Chile

References

External links
 Decorations, Cancilleria Ministerio de Relaciones Exteriores.
 World Awards

Orders, decorations, and medals of Colombia